Tan Yunxian (1461–1554) was a Chinese physician during the Ming dynasty in China.

Life
Tan's grandmother was the daughter of a physician.  One reason Tan's grandfather married her grandmother was to learn medicine himself.  Two of her grandparents' sons were able to pass the jinshi examinations, and they became officials. One of these sons was Tan's father.  Due to the fondness her grandparents had for her, which evidence shows was directly related to her intellect, her grandparents passed on their medical knowledge to her.  Tan Yunxian later married, raised four children, and practiced medicine on women.  Tan lived a longer life than most, dying at the age of 93.

Medical activity
Tan Yunxian's medical practice was contained to treating women. She initially began by treating her own children, with her grandmother's guidance to confirm her diagnoses. Records of Tan's book reveal cases of thirty-one of the patients that she treated.  The women she worked with usually had chronic complaints, rather than of temporary illnesses. In Ming China, many of the women had “women’s complaints,” such as menstrual irregularities, repeated miscarriages, barrenness, and postpartum fatigue.  Other patients had illnesses that either sex could contract, such as coughing, insomnia, rashes, swellings, diarrhea or nausea.

Tan, similar to other literati doctors, often prescribed herbal medications to her patients.  Tan also practiced moxibustion.  This was the burning of moxa, or dried Artemisia, at specified points on the body, which was similar to acupuncture.   This process, stimulated the circulation of qi.  Since the physician applying the moxa had to physically touch the patient, male doctors were unable to perform this treatment on women. Tan served many working women in her practice.  Various accounts show Tan's conclusions of how these women often overworked themselves, thus bringing on various symptoms.

Although Tan Yunxian was able to practice gynecology, pediatrics and obstetrics, her experience in other fields was limited.  Tan was only able to practice medicine in the country among her friends or acquaintances.  Even after she completed the book Sayings of a Female Doctor, she was not able to publish it.  In fact, she had to ask her son to have printing blocks cut for her.

Status of female physicians in Ming China
Quite different from their male counterparts of ancient China, women did not hone their skills from masters nor did they have the purpose or goal in mind to set up their own clinics after their apprenticeship.  For females, family training was the standard mode of education.  While women were quite skilled in their medical techniques, they rarely made any theoretical additions to the field.  Unlike the male doctors of the times, women received medical training in order to assist the males in their family by doing some “supporting work.”

Popular portrayal
A character that combines Tan with Jingtai Emperor consort Empress Hang was portrayed by Cecilia Liu in 2016 Chinese historical drama series The Imperial Doctress.

References

15th-century Chinese physicians
16th-century Chinese physicians
Chinese women physicians
1461 births
1554 deaths
Scientists from Wuxi
16th-century women scientists
15th-century Chinese women
15th-century Chinese people
16th-century Chinese women
16th-century Chinese people
Ming dynasty people
Physicians from Jiangsu